Titan is a steel roller coaster located at Six Flags Over Texas in Arlington, Texas. Titan opened as the tallest, fastest, and longest roller coaster in Texas.

History
Six Flags Over Texas made plans to add a hypercoaster to the park's lineup with an early proposal from Arrow Dynamics, placing a new roller coaster over the park's reservoir next to the Judge Roy Scream attraction. In August 2000, the park publicly revealed their plans in celebration of the park's 40th anniversary. Although specifications were withheld, they confirmed Giovanola as the manufacturer and that the new coaster would be similar to Goliath at Six Flags Magic Mountain and constructed in the Texas section of the park. As survey markers began to appear in September, it became clear that the new coaster would extend from the Texas section to the employee cantina, pool and softball fields then out into the parking lot. By the time the official announcement, employee areas had been demolished, and teal-colored supports were beginning to arrive stacked in the parking lot. Construction was completed in March 2001 and testing began the following month. A media preview was held on April 26, 2001, and Titan opened to the public the following day.

Titan became one of the top ten fastest roller coasters in the United States, with its speed matched by Phantom's Revenge at Kennywood and Goliath at Six Flags Magic Mountain. 

During the 2013 season, the trains would receive new seat belts.

Ride experience

Titan begins with a slow U-turn out of the station and  then a climb up a  hill. At the summit the train drops  into a  underground tunnel. Immediately after the tunnel, riders are taken through a large turnaround to the right. Following the turnaround, riders encounter a large camel back that provides significant airtime. The train subsequently enters a 540 degree upwards helix which leads to the mid-course brake run. Off the mid-course brakes, the trains maneuver a left hand drop, leading into an over-banked turn. Then followed by a 570 degree downward helix with a camera installed for souvenir photos. Afterwards, the trains navigate a banked turn to the left and then another to the right. After this, the trains enters the final brake run and returns to the station.

Characteristics

Track 
With one difference, the overall track layout of Titan is identical to that of Goliath at Six Flags Magic Mountain, the difference being that Goliath is 10' shorter in height and lacks the upward helix into the mid-course brake run, instead having a simple uphill left turn. 

Titan's supports used 2.8 million pounds of steel to manufacture. When it was built, Titan was the longest roller coaster ever to be built at a Six Flags park.

Trains 
Titan operates with up to three trains, each with five cars holding three rows of two riders for a total of 30 riders per train. The three trains are colored red, orange, and yellow. It will usually run only two trains on slow days, with the unused train stored in the train's storage shed (the train that is unused from day to day is swapped out on a regular basis).

During the summer months, as the train rolls into the station, a cloud of mist can be seen under the train. Owing to problems with the wheels on the trains overheating, water is sprayed on the wheel assembly to help cool down the wheels after the train completes the course.

Incidents
Like Goliath, Titan has been known for occasionally causing blackouts or grayouts in the helices. Some riders have complained about headaches caused by sections of the course. Most of these incidents occur during the summer when riders are dehydrated due to the extreme Texas heat. Because of the complaints about the G-forces given during the second helix, the trains have to be severely braked at the mid-course brakes, almost to the point of stopping.

Rankings

References

External links 
Titan's Official Page From Six Flags Over Texas
POV Video of Titan

Roller coasters operated by Six Flags
Roller coasters introduced in 2001
Roller coasters in Texas
Six Flags Over Texas